Chaetocnema pulicaria, also known as the corn flea beetle and clover flea beetle, is a species of flea beetle from Chrysomelidae family, found in Texas, USA and Canada.

Description
The species is black in color, with orange legs and antennae.

Species lifecycle
The females lay eggs in  soil, which  has plants growing nearby. The eggs hatch in 7 to 14 days into larvae. While in their larval stage, their small, worm-like bodies are white. The larvae feed especially on plants' roots, causing serious damage. Then, they transform into pupae, and a week later, into adults.

Pest
The species is known for causing damage to crops. The damaged plants include sorghum, soybeans, sweet corn, small grains, and some vegetables. They feed on both sides of a leaf (upper and lower parts), including epidermis and the veins. They also transmit Stewart's wilt; by removing the leaf tissue from the plant, they open a wound which allows the disease to begin spreading from plant to plant. The disease organism is Pantoea stewartii.

References

Alticini
Beetles described in 1880
Beetles of North America
Taxa named by Frederick Ernst Melsheimer